The Vietnam Women's Memorial is a memorial dedicated to the nurses and women of the United States who served in the Vietnam War. It depicts three uniformed women with a wounded soldier and serves as a reminder of the important support and caregiving roles that women played in the war as nurses, air traffic controllers, communication specialists, etc. It is part of the Vietnam Veterans Memorial and is located in National Mall in Washington D.C., a short distance south of The Wall and north of the Reflecting Pool.

Diane Carlson Evans, RN, a former Army nurse, founded the Vietnam Women's Memorial Project (now the Vietnam Women's Memorial Foundation) in 1984.  The monument was designed by sculptor Glenna Goodacre and dedicated as part of the Vietnam Veterans Memorial on November 11, 1993.

The memorial has been criticized for inaccuracy in that it depicts nurses giving medical care in the field. Such primary care was only given by medics and corpsmen, with nurses working in military hospitals behind the front lines.

See also
 List of public art in Washington, D.C., Ward 2
 Women in the Vietnam War
 Vietnam Veterans Memorial

References

External links

 Vietnam Women's Memorial Foundation
 The women who died in the war
 Noonie Fortin's list of US women lost in Vietnam
 Donut Dollie Diary, a site about Susan McLean and Ginny Kirsch
 C-Span Video: Dedication ceremony

Artworks in the collection of the National Park Service
Monuments and memorials in Washington, D.C.
Women's Memorial
National Mall
Nursing monuments and memorials
Women in the United States military
Military monuments and memorials in the United States
Outdoor sculptures in Washington, D.C.
1993 sculptures
Bronze sculptures in Washington, D.C.
Monuments and memorials to women
Sculptures of women in Washington, D.C.
Sculptures of men in Washington, D.C.
Statues in Washington, D.C.